Powerchip Technology Corporation manufactures and sells semiconductor products, in particular memory chips and other integrated circuits. As of 2020, the company was the 7th largest semiconductor foundry in the world with three 12 inch and two 8 inch wafer labs. The company offers foundry services as well as design, manufacturing and test services. It was formerly known as Powerchip Semiconductor Corp. and changed its name in June 2010. Powerchip Technology Corporation was founded in 1994 and is headquartered in Hsinchu, Taiwan.

Overview
In 2017, its net profit was NT$8.08 billion. The company plans to invest NT$278 billion (US$9.04 billion) to build two new 12-inch wafer plants in Hsinchu Science Park, with construction scheduled to start in 2020

In March 2021, Powerchip broke ground on a new factory in Miaoli County that will manufacture chips with 45-nanometer and 50-nanometer technologies. The plant will employ and additional 3,000 workers.

Powerchip is a significant supplier to the automotive industry.

See also
 List of semiconductor fabrication plants
 List of companies of Taiwan

References

Semiconductor companies of Taiwan
Foundry semiconductor companies
Manufacturing companies based in Hsinchu
Electronics companies established in 1994
Companies listed on the Taiwan Stock Exchange
Private equity portfolio companies
Taiwanese brands
Taiwanese companies established in 1994